Hämeenkoski (Koski Hl until 1995, see Koski Tl) is a former municipality of Finland. It was merged to the municipality of Hollola on 1 January 2016.

It is located in the province of Southern Finland and is part of the Päijänne Tavastia region. The municipality was unilingually Finnish.

Lake Pääjärvi is situated at the border between Hämeenkoski and Hämeenlinna (formerly Lammi).

History 
Hämeenkoski was originally known as Koski. It was initially a part of the Lammi administrative division and the Hauho parish. Lammi became a separate parish in the beginning of the 15th century or slightly earlier. Koski was first mentioned as a separate parish in 1410, but it was merged into Lammi as a chapel community in 1540. The chapel was also known as Etola after another village in the area. Koski became a separate parish from Lammi in 1870. The name Hämeen-Koski was first suggested for the parish in 1897 by Väino Wallin to distinguish it from Koski Tl, at the time still a part of Marttila. Koski Hl was renamed Hämeenkoski in 1995.

Hämeenkoski was consolidated with Hollola in 2016.

References

External links
 
 Municipality of Hämeenkoski – Official website

Hämeenkoski
Former municipalities of Finland
Populated places established in 1865